Votskaya Urada (Votyak Uraźı) is a rural locality (a selo) in Novoartaulsky Selsoviet, Yanaulsky District, Bashkortostan, Russia. The population was 155 as of 2010. There are 3 streets.

Geography 
Votskaya Urada is located 16 km north of Yanaul (the district's administrative centre) by road. Varyash is the nearest rural locality.

References 

Rural localities in Yanaulsky District